Waghad Dam, is an earthfill dam on Kalwan river near Dindori, Nashik district in the state of Maharashtra in India.

Specifications

Purpose
 Irrigation

See also
 Dams in Maharashtra
 List of reservoirs and dams in India

References

Dams in Nashik district
Dams completed in 1979
1979 establishments in Maharashtra